The Dynamic Jack McDuff is an album by organist Jack McDuff recorded in 1964 and released on the Prestige label.

Reception
Allmusic awarded the album 3 stars.

Track listing 
All compositions by Jack McDuff except as indicated
 "The Main Theme from the Paramount Picture The Carpetbaggers" (Elmer Bernstein) - 3:14   
 "You Better Love Me" (Hugh Martin, Timothy Gray) - 4:34   
 "Once in a Lifetime" (Leslie Bricusse, Anthony Newley) - 5:31   
 "The Theme from The Pink Panther" (Henry Mancini) - 5:15   
 "Rail Head" - 6:07   
 "What's New?" (Bob Haggart, Johnny Burke) - 7:20   
 "Bossa Nova West" - 5:50  
Recorded in Los Angeles, California on February 6 & 7, 1964 (tracks 5-7) and in New York City on April 23, 1964 (tracks 1-4)

Personnel 
Jack McDuff - organ
Red Holloway - tenor saxophone 
George Benson - guitar
Joe Dukes - drums 
Unidentified orchestra arranged and conducted by Benny Golson (tracks 1-4)

References 

Jack McDuff albums
1964 albums
Prestige Records albums
Albums arranged by Benny Golson